Najib Farssane (born 11 June 1981) is a French former professional footballer who played as a forward.

He played on the professional level in Ligue 2 for Stade de Reims. He also played in Italy for Pisa in Serie C1 and for Sestrese in Serie D.

At the conclusion of the 2009–10 season, it was announced that Farssane would be leaving FC Rouen to sign for National league rivals AS Beauvais.

References

External links
 
 

1981 births
Living people
People from Vitry-le-François
Sportspeople from Marne (department)
French footballers
Association football forwards
Ligue 2 players
Championnat National players
Championnat National 2 players
Championnat National 3 players
Grenoble Foot 38 players
Pisa S.C. players
F.S. Sestrese Calcio 1919 players
CO Châlons players
Stade de Reims players
AS Beauvais Oise players
FC Rouen players
SO Romorantin players
USL Dunkerque players
RC Épernay Champagne players
French expatriate footballers
French expatriate sportspeople in Italy
Expatriate footballers in Italy
Footballers from Grand Est